Bailieborough Community School, alternatively spelled as Bailieboro, and commonly referred to as BCS, is a community school located in the town of Bailieborough, County Cavan, Ireland. The school was an amalgamation of two previous schools in the town; Bailieborough Vocation School, colloquially called The Tech; and Lourdesville Secondary School, colloquially referred to as 'The Convent'. The school was built on the site of the existing Lourdesville School, and was opened on the 8 November 1982 by the then Minister for Posts and Telegraphs, John P. Wilson.

The school has 36 teaching classrooms, a physical education gym, a gaelic football pitch and two car parks. As of 2019, there were over 630 students enrolled in BCS.

Programs

Leaving Certificate Vocational Programme 

Bailieborough Community School offers the Leaving Cert Vocational Programme (LCVP) in the school to all fifth years who achieve certain qualifications. These qualifications are based on the electives that the student chooses for their Leaving Certificate, along with the three core subjects - Irish, English and Mathematics.

Transition Year 
The Transition Year (TY) program is a year of school between third year (end of Junior Cycle) and fifth year (beginning of Leaving Cert) which allows for students to engage in more extra-curricular activities such as BT Young Scientist and Technology Exhibition and Young Social Innovators. The program usually takes in 40-50 students on a yearly basis.

Sport 
The most prominent sport that the school takes part in is Gaelic football, with other sports including rugby, basketball, handball, badminton, camogie and cross country running. Physical education is under the stewardship of Johnny Brady, former Cavan footballer who was on the 1997 Ulster Senior Football Championship Final winning team; Damian McIntyre is another member of the teaching staff who plays Gaelic football with Shercock GFC.

The school's senior Gaelic football team reached the final of Group D in the 2019-2020 championship. They were defeated by Ballybay Community College.

Music 
The school has hosted several musicals, including Anne of Green Gables, My Fair Lady and Annie Get Your Gun.

Facilities and development 
The school is located on a site between Chapel Road and the Virginia Road of the town. The school is home to a standard Gaelic games pitch and a large sports hall. The school physically consists of two buildings: the main building, which contains the five "areas", and the E-area building. Each of these areas cater for a year in the school, providing access to lockers.

The school has three science labs and a science room. A design and communication graphics lab is also present in the school, along with two computer rooms, a small library, two woodwork rooms, two metalwork rooms, an oratory, staff canteen, student canteen, two home economic rooms, a general office and a number of other rooms for storage.

From 2014 to 2017 the school went through a series of upgrades. The first upgrade which took place between 2014 and 2015 and was the replacement of the school roof and doors. The school roof had become aged and was replaced with a new modern roof. All doors in the school were replaced by fireproof doors. From 2015 to 2016 the upgrade of the school traffic system took place. Two new car parks were built which replaced an old park which became the site of a new school facility. The traffic management system was upgraded to also include a new one-way system and to improve  the efficiency of school drop-off and collection. After the completion of the traffic management system, a new building which included improved facilities for students with autism and disability was built. During the summer of 2017, new canteen facilities were also installed, which allowed for hot food to be sold at lunch time, which was provided by an external catering company.

Notable alumni and teaching staff 

 Leanne Kiernan, professional woman's footballer.
 Michael Router, former Parish Priest for Killann, former Chaplain of BCS and Auxiliary Bishop of the Roman Catholic Archdiocese of Armagh.
 Philip Leo O'Reilly, former Chaplain of BCS and former Bishop of Kilmore.
 Niamh Smyth, Irish Fianna Fáil politician.

References

Secondary schools in County Cavan